THe SADAD payment system was established by the Saudi Arabian Monetary Agency (SAMA) to be the national electronic bill presentment and payment (EBPP) service provider for the Kingdom of Saudi Arabia (KSA). The core mandate for SADAD is to facilitate and streamline bill payment transactions of end consumers through all channels of the KSA (Kingdome of Saudi Arabia) Banks. SADAD was launched on May 19, 1999.

SADAD links the commercial sector and local banks, offering the ability to collect customer payments electronically through all the banking channels in the KSA (Kingdome of Saudi Arabia)  24 hours a day.

History and background

SAMA mandated that all banks accept bill payments from anyone at their branches. The payer does not have to be a customer of the bank. Pre-SADAD economics of bill payment placed an unduly significant burden on banks; it needed to be more efficient and faster. Banks recovered a small portion of the cost by keeping the collected money for 7–30 days after the bill was paid.

Approximately 60-70% of bills were paid in cash at bank branches. The high number of invoices generated in the Kingdom increases bank costs in the front office, payment processing, IT integration and reconciliation. In addition, consumers queue for a long time at banks’ front office desks before paying their bills. Bill presentment and collection are primarily manual and paper-based, creating significant inefficiencies and overheads for billers and banks.

Large billers formed bilateral agreements with banks to enhance bill payment collection. This enabled consumers to use their bank channels to view and pay bills (without any bill consolidation). It required every biller to connect to the twelve banks operating in KSA and from banks to connect separately to every biller under contract.

SAMA chose to integrate these connections through SADAD, a single platform that links different billers and banks to enable consumers to use the electronic channels of any bank. SADAD is now facilitating the payment of high-volume periodic bills (such as utility and phone bills) and customer-initiated payments, such as traffic fines.

How SADAD works

 Billers send summary bills information to SADAD at a pre-determined schedule
 SADAD validates data received and uploads it into its database
 SADAD notifies billers of any discrepancies
 Customer requests bill information through bank channels
 The bank forwards the request received to SADAD
 SADAD retrieves bill information from its database and forwards it to customer
 Customer selects the bills to be paid and the respective amounts
 The bank debits the customer account and confirms the transaction
 SADAD updates its database based on the bank’s confirmation
 SADAD notifies relevant billers accordingly
 At the end of the day, billers receive reconciliation reports from SADAD showing a breakdown of all transactions processed by SADAD
 At the end of the day, SADAD initiates settlement ins1111tructions through SARIE
 SADAD updates bills status to 'settled'

Connected billers

See also
Electronic billing
E-commerce payment systems
Saudi Payments Network (SPAN)

References

External links
 Official website 

Finance in Saudi Arabia
Payment systems